Pakdasht (also Romanized as Pākdasht; also known as Palasht, Palesht, Palishth, Polasht, and Pol Dasht) is a city in the Central District of Pakdasht County, Tehran province, Iran, and serves as capital of the county. At the 2006 census, its population was 126,281 in 32,625 households. The following census in 2011 counted 206,490 people in 58,257 households. The latest census in 2016 showed a population of 236,319 people in 70,220 households.

References 

Pakdasht County

Cities in Tehran Province

Populated places in Tehran Province

Populated places in Pakdasht County